The Mayor of Cagliari is an elected politician who, along with the Cagliari's City Council, is accountable for the strategic government of Cagliari in Sardinia, Italy. The current Mayor is Paolo Truzzu, a member of the far-right party Brothers of Italy, elected on 17 June 2019.

Overview
According to the Italian Constitution, the Mayor of Cagliari is member of the City Council.

The Mayor is elected by the population of Cagliari, who also elects the members of the City Council, controlling the Mayor's policy guidelines and is able to enforce his resignation by a motion of no confidence. The Mayor is entitled to appoint and release the members of his government.

Since 1994 the Mayor is elected directly by Cagliari's electorate: in all mayoral elections in Italy in cities with a population higher than 15,000 the voters express a direct choice for the mayor or an indirect choice voting for the party of the candidate's coalition. If no candidate receives at least 50% of votes, the top two candidates go to a second round after two weeks. The election of the City Council is based on a direct choice for the candidate with a preference vote: the candidate with the majority of the preferences is elected. The number of the seats for each party is determined proportionally.

Kingdom of Sardinia (1848–1861) 
The office of Mayor of Cagliari (Sindaco di Cagliari) was created in 1848 after the promulgation of the Albertine Statute.

Kingdom of Italy (1861–1946) 
Initially appointed by the King, the Mayor of Cagliari was elected by the City council from 1899 to 1926. In 1926, the Fascist dictatorship abolished mayors and City councils, replacing them with an authoritarian Podestà chosen by the National Fascist Party. The office of Mayor was restored in 1944 during the Allied occupation.

Italian Republic (since 1946)

City Council election (1946–1994)
From 1946 to 1994, the Mayor of Cagliari was elected by the City Council.

Direct election (since 1994)
Since 1994, under provisions of new local administration law, the Mayor of Cagliari is chosen by direct election.

Notes

Timeline

See also
 Timeline of Cagliari

References

External links
 
 

Cagliari
 
Politics of Sardinia
Cagliari